F-box only protein 38 (FBXO38) is a protein that in humans is encoded by the FBXO38 gene.

Mutations in the FBXO38 gene are associated with distal spinal muscular atrophy with calf predominance. FBXO38 controls the composition of centromeric chromatin via the stability of ZXDA/B nuclear factors. Mice deficient in Fbxo38 gene have defective spermatogenesis and are growth retarded.

References

External links 
 
 

Human proteins